Turbonilla decora is a species of sea snail, a marine gastropod mollusk in the family Pyramidellidae, the pyrams and their allies.

Distribution
The type specimen of this marine species was found off Port Alfred, South Africa.

References

External links
 To World Register of Marine Species

decora
Gastropods described in 1904